The Daikyo Dolphins were formerly the Gold Coast Clippers, a foundation team in the now defunct Australian Baseball League. The Clippers changed their name to the Daikyo Dolphins following the signing of a major sponsorship deal with Japanese real estate development company Daikyo to create one of the strongest teams in ABL history. Daikyo ended its sponsorship of the club due to financial troubles in Australia, and after a season of being known as the Gold Coast Dolphins in 1992/93, the club changed its name again to the East Coast Cougars (later Gold Coast Cougars) as of the 1993/94 season.

History

See also 
Sport in Australia
Australian Baseball
Australian Baseball League (1989–1999)

External links
The Australian Baseball League: 1989–1999

Australian Baseball League (1989–1999) teams
Defunct baseball teams in Australia
Sporting teams based on the Gold Coast, Queensland